King Street–Old Town (also known by its former name, King Street) is a Washington Metro station in Alexandria, Virginia, United States. The station opened on December 17, 1983, and is operated by the Washington Metropolitan Area Transit Authority (WMATA). Providing service for both the Blue and Yellow Lines, this is the southernmost transfer station for the Blue and Yellow lines, as the two lines diverge just south of the station. During inclement weather,  is commonly used as an unofficial transfer point, being the southernmost underground station common to both lines.

The station is located at King Street and Commonwealth Avenue. Entrances to the station are located on King Street and on the Diagonal Road side of the station. The station is above ground, and access to the single island platform is provided by one pair of escalators, one staircase, and one elevator.

History

Originally scheduled to open in summer 1982, its opening was delayed due to both unavailability of new subway cars and the lack of a test track. Construction of the station was complete by summer 1982, and in September 1983 Metro announced the station would open that December as the new cars would be ready for service. The station opened on December 17, 1983.

An expansion to the station added a second entrance and mezzanine across Commonwealth Avenue from the existing mezzanine, with the new entrance located on Cameron Street, across from the nearby Hilton Hotel. The expansion also includes a new canopy over the north end of the platform, designed to match the original canopy. A gap was left between the two canopies to preserve the view of the George Washington Masonic Memorial from Old Town.

The station was named King Street from its 1983 opening until November 3, 2011, when the station was given its present name as part of a preparation for service changes planned for 2012.

In May 2018, Metro announced an extensive renovation of platforms at twenty stations across the system. The Blue and Yellow Lines south of Ronald Reagan Washington National Airport station, including the King Street–Old Town station, were closed from May 25 to September 9, 2019, during which the platforms at this station were be rebuilt, along with new platform tiles, new passenger information displays, and other improvements.

The bus, parking, and Kiss and Ride area of King is undergoing a complete reconstruction and is closed, beginning November 2018 until planned reopening dates of Spring 2020 for buses and Fall 2020 for Kiss and Ride and taxis. Temporary bus bays are on Diagonal Road, along portions of Daingerfield Road, and on King Street.

Between September 10 and November 5, 2022, King Street-Old Town was closed due to the Potomac Yard station tie-in, closing all stations south of Ronald Reagan Washington National Airport station. Shuttle buses were provided throughout the shutdown.

Transit connections 
The station is adjacent to Alexandria Union Station, together with which it serves Old Town Alexandria and as a transit hub for the city as a whole. Plans are in place to build a tunnel to allow a direct connection between the heavy rail station and the Metro station; presently transfers must be made by exiting either station and walking along a narrow sidewalk on King Street. Both Metrobus and DASH provide service to the station. A free daily trolley service provides direct access to Old Town and the Waterfront, making many stops along King Street. Car sharing is also available. The station is about 12 blocks (one mile or 1.6 kilometers) from the intersection of King and Washington Streets; it is about 17 blocks from the Waterfront.

Station layout
The station has an elevated island platform over King Street west of Diagonal Road. Two fare control areas on either side of King Street provide escalator and elevator access to the platform.

Notable places nearby 
 George Washington Masonic National Memorial
 National Science Foundation
 Regent University, Alexandria Campus
 United States Patent and Trademark Office (PTO)

References

External links 

 The Schumin Web Transit Center: King Street–Old Town Station
 South entrance from Google Maps Street View
 King Street entrance from Google Maps Street View
 Commonwealth Avenue entrance from Google Maps Street View

Stations on the Blue Line (Washington Metro)
Washington Metro stations in Virginia
Stations on the Yellow Line (Washington Metro)
Railway stations in the United States opened in 1983
Transportation in Alexandria, Virginia
1983 establishments in Virginia